Stomp, along with Stroll, are the seventh and eighth studio albums by the Boston ska punk band Big D and the Kids Table, released simultaneously on June 11, 2013 by Strictly Rude Records.

Dedicated to the memory of Anthony Spaulding, an Allston resident, sound engineering student, and Big D fan who was murdered on January 1, 2013.

Track listing
"Stepping Out" - 3:03
"Shit Tattoos" - 2:27
"Social Muckery" - 1:55
"Pinball" - 3:38
"Static" - 2:00
"The Noise" - 2:08
"Temperamental" - 2:07
"Don't Compare Me to You" - 2:37
"Dirty Daniel" - 4:03
"Pitch 'n' Sway" - 3:53
"You Treat Everyone Like Shit" - 3:33
"Line Selector" - 2:49
"No Moaning at the Bar" - 5:59

Personnel
David McWane – Vocals, Dubs, Tambourine
Derek Davis - Drums, Tambourine, Shaker
Alex Stern - Guitar, Piano, Organ, Vocals
Ryan O'Connor - Saxophone, Melodica, Vocals
Stephen Foote - Bass Guitar
Marc Flynn - Vocals
Ben Corrigan - Vocals
Billy Kottage - Trombone
Nate Leskovic - Trombone
Paul E. Cutler - Trombone
Matthew Giorgio - Trumpet
Dan Stoppelman - Trumpet
Logan La Barbera - Trombone
Andy Bergman - Baritone Saxophone
Casey Gruttadauria - Organ, Piano
Steve Jackson - Vocals (Courtesy of The Pietasters)

External links 
 Band Website
 Kickstarter campaign

References 

2013 albums
Big D and the Kids Table albums
Kickstarter-funded albums